Srednyaya Oka (Urta Aqa) is a rural locality (a village) in Bolsheokinsky Selsoviet, Mechetlinsky District, Bashkortostan, Russia. The population was 319 as of 2010. There are 2 streets.

Geography 
Srednyaya Oka is located 14 km north of Bolsheustyikinskoye (the district's administrative centre) by road. Bolshaya Oka is the nearest rural locality.

References 

Rural localities in Mechetlinsky District